Tariqabad is a neighbourhood located in Faisalabad, Punjab, Pakistan. The Faisalabad railway station is located in the town. Tariqabad is one of the oldest towns of Faisalabad.

Education
Fatima Jinnah Degree College for Women, Tariqabad, Faisalabad

See also
 List of railway stations in Pakistan
 Pakistan Railways

References

External links

Faisalabad